is a 1977 Japanese film directed by Shirō Moritani. Based on the novelist Jirō Nitta's recounting of the Hakkōda Mountains incident, the film tells the story of two infantry regiments of the Imperial Japanese Army, consisting of 210 men, that tried to traverse the Hakkōda Mountains in the winter of 1902, in preparation for the anticipated Russo-Japanese War. The film was Japan's submission to the 50th Academy Awards for the Academy Award for Best Foreign Language Film, but was not accepted as a nominee.

Cast
 Ken Takakura as Captain Tokushima (徳島)
 Kin'ya Kitaōji as Captain Kanda (神田)
 Yūzō Kayama as Captain Kurata (倉田)
 Rentarō Mikuni as Major Yamada (山田)
 Komaki Kurihara as Hatsuko Kanda (Captain Kanda's wife)
 Hideji Otaki as Colonel Nakabayashi (中林)
 Shōgo Shimada as General Tomoda, commander of the 4th Brigade (友田)
 Akira Hamada as Lieutenant Tanabe (田辺)
 Mariko Kaga as Taeko Tokushima (Captain Tokushima's wife)
 Kenichi Kato as Sublieutenant Takahata (高畑)
 Ren Ebata as Apprentice Officer Funayama (船山)
 Gin Maeda as Corporal Saitō (斎藤)
 Kin Sugai as Saitō's mother
 Ben Hiura as Satō (佐藤)
 Kumiko Akiyoshi as Takiguchi Sawa, a local mountain guide from Utarube village (滝口さわ)
 Hanasawa Tokue as Takiguchi Denzō, Utarube​ villager and adoptive father of Sawa (滝口伝蔵)
 Yoshi Kato as Saemon, chief of Tamogino village (作右衛門)
 Jun Tazaki as Sadao Suzuki, master of the Sanbongi relay station (鈴木貞雄)
 Isao Tamagawa as Captain Okitsu (沖津)
 Takuya Fujioka as Major Monma, commander of the 1st Battalion (門間)
 Shigeru Koyama as Major Kinomiya, officer at the regimental headquarters (木宮)
 Katsutoshi Arata as Eto (江藤)
 Michihiro Yamanishi as Noguchi (野口)
 Kensaku Morita as Sublieutenant Mikami (三上)
 Kohei Takayama as Apprentice Officer Nagao (長尾)
 Keiju Kobayashi as Commander Tsumura (津村)
 Ken Ogata as Corporal Murayama (村山)
 Tetsurō Tamba as Colonel Kojima (小島)
 Funahashi Saburō as Saikai Yūjirō, a war correspondent​ for the Tō-Ō Nippō (西海勇次郎)

See also
 List of submissions to the 50th Academy Awards for Best Foreign Language Film
 List of Japanese submissions for the Academy Award for Best Foreign Language Film

References

External links

 

1977 films
1970s Japanese-language films
Films scored by Yasushi Akutagawa
Films set in the Meiji period
1970s Japanese films